What You See Is What You Sweat is the thirty-third studio album by American singer Aretha Franklin, released on June 25, 1991, by Arista Records. It peaked at #153 on Billboards album chart, dropping off after seven weeks. This was Franklin's first new release in the Nielsen SoundScan era.

Track listing

Personnel
 Aretha Franklin – lead vocals, piano, background vocals
 Paul Jackson Jr. – guitar
 Peter Schwartz – additional keyboards
 Michel Legrand – synthesizer
 Franck Thore – Pan pipes
 Dean Parks – guitar
 Burt Bacharach – keyboards
 Marcus Miller – bass guitar
 Thierry Eliez – piano
 Elliot Wolff – keyboards, drum programming
 Teddy F. White – guitar
 Al Turner – bass guitar
 Buster Marbury – drums
 Michael Boddicker – keyboards, programming
 Larry Fratangelo – percussion
 Hubert Eaves III – keyboards, drum programming
 Charles Scales – synthesizer
 Rick Iantosca – acoustic guitar
 Oliver Leiber – keyboards, drum programming, guitar
 Jason Miles – keyboards
 Dominique Bertram – bass guitar
 Joshua Thompson – keyboards, guitar, synthesizer
 Vernon Black – guitar
 Randy Waldman – keyboards
 Onita Sanders – harp
 André Ceccarelli – drums
 Louis Biancaniello – keyboards, programming
 Larry Williams – programming
 David Foster – keyboards, programming
 Paulinho da Costa – percussion
 Candy Dulfer – saxophone
 Guy Vaughn – drum programming
 David Townsend – guitar
 Narada Michael Walden – drums, programming
 Nat Adderley Jr. – keyboards
 Bobby Wooten – keyboards, electric piano, drum programming, synthesizer
 David Boruff – saxophone
 Rudolph Stansfield – piano
 Jean-Marc Benais – guitar
 Gene Lennon – programming
 Skip Anderson – keyboards
 Cindy Mizelle – background vocals
 Jesse Richardson – background vocals
 Sandra Feva – background vocals
 Brenda Corbett – background vocals
 Fonzi Thornton – background vocals
 Diane Green – background vocals
 Sherry Fox – background vocals
 Portia Griffin – background vocals
 Margaret Branch – background vocals
 Jarvis Barker – background vocals
 Nikita Germaine – background vocals
 Skyler Jett – background vocals
 Jeanie Tracy – background vocals
 Tony Lindsay – background vocals
 Gwen Guthrie – background vocals
 Tawatha Agee – background vocals
 Donna Davis – background vocals
 Marj Harber – background vocals
 Esther Ridgeway – background vocals
 Gloria Ridgeway – background vocals
 Gracie Ridgeway – background vocals

Charts

References

Aretha Franklin albums
1991 albums
Albums produced by Narada Michael Walden
Albums produced by Burt Bacharach
Arista Records albums
New jack swing albums